The Asian Volleyball Confederation, commonly known by the acronym AVC, is the continental governing body for the sports of indoor, beach, and grass volleyball in Asia and Oceania. It has 65 member associations, mostly located in the Asia-Pacific region, but excludes four transcontinental countries with territory in both Asia and Europe – Azerbaijan, Georgia, Russia, and Turkey – along with Armenia, Cyprus, and Israel, which are members of the CEV instead.

The main headquarters is located in Bangkok, Thailand and the current president is Rita Subowo of Indonesia.

Board of Administration

President
 Rita Subowo
Senior Executive Vice President
 Cai Yi
Executive Vice President
 Abdulaziz A. Albalool
Executive Zonal Vice Presidents
 Ali Ghanim Al-Kuwari (Western Zone)
 Ramavtar Singh Jakhar (Central Zone)
 Cai Yi (Eastern Zone)
 Kiattipong Radchatagriengkai (Southeastern Zone)
 Hugh Graham (Oceania Zone)
Secretary General
 Kiattipong Radchatagriengkai
Treasurer
 Cai Yi

Board Members
 Shaikh Ali bin Mohamed bin Rashid Al Khalifa
 Badar Ali Said Al Rawas
 Atiqul Islam
 Yermek Syrlybayev
 Mohammed Reza Davarzani
 Eom Han-joo
 Kenji Shimaoka
 Wang Kuei-shiang
 Trần Đức Phấn
 Thein Win
 Craig Carracher
 Terry Sasser
Female Members
 Fong Sok Van Alice Oliver
 Hila Asanuma
Auditor
 Jehad Khalfan

List of presidents
 Masaichi Nishikawa (1952–1976)
 Nemesio Yabut (1976–1979)
 Yutaka Maeda (1979–1985)
 Yasutaka Matsudaira (1985–1996)
 Yuan Weimin (1997–2001)
 Wei Jizhong (2001–2008)
 Saleh A Bin Nasser (2008–2020)
 Rita Subowo (2020–present)

Member associations

Notes:

* The Central Zone includes member associations from Central Asia and Southern Asia.

† Possible future member associations from Oceania: Christmas Island, the Cocos (Keeling) Islands, New Caledonia, Norfolk Island, the Pitcairn Islands, Tokelau, and Wallis and Futuna.

FIVB World Rankings

Tournaments

Championships
The AVC organizes three championships, involving two of three FIVB disciplines (volleyball and beach volleyball).

Asian Men's Volleyball Championship (held in odd years; held in every two years as FIVB Volleyball Men's World Championship Qualification Tournament since 2021)
Asian Women's Volleyball Championship (held in odd years; held in every two years as FIVB Volleyball Women's World Championship Qualification Tournament since 2021)
Asian Beach Volleyball Championships (held in every year; involving two-gender tournaments)
Asian Beach Volleyball Tour - Since 2008

Age-restricted championships
The AVC also runs various competitions restricted to a younger age.

Asian Men's U23 Volleyball Championship (held in odd years as FIVB Volleyball Men's U23 World Championship Qualification Tournament)
Asian Women's U23 Volleyball Championship (held in odd years as FIVB Volleyball Women's U23 World Championship Qualification Tournament)
Asian Men's U20 Volleyball Championship (held in even years as FIVB Volleyball Men's U21 World Championship Qualification Tournament)
Asian Women's U20 Volleyball Championship (held in even years as FIVB Volleyball Women's U21 World Championship Qualification Tournament)
Asian Boys' U18 Volleyball Championship (held in even years as FIVB Volleyball Boys' U19 World Championship Qualification Tournament)
Asian Girls' U18 Volleyball Championship (held in even years as FIVB Volleyball Girls' U18 World Championship Qualification Tournament)
Asian U21 Beach Volleyball Championships (held in even years as FIVB Beach Volleyball U21 World Championships Qualification Tournament; involving two-gender tournaments)
Asian U19 Beach Volleyball Championships (held in even years as FIVB Beach Volleyball U19 World Championships Qualification Tournament; involving two-gender tournaments)
Asian U17 Beach Volleyball Championships (held in even years as FIVB Beach Volleyball U17 World Championships Qualification Tournament; involving two-gender tournaments)

Cups
The AVC organizes four cups for volleyball national teams in two divisions per gender.
AVC Cup for Men (held in even year; top division for men's national teams)
AVC Cup for Women (held in even year; top division for women's national teams)
AVC Men's Challenge Cup (held in even year; bottom division for men's national teams)
AVC Women's Challenge Cup (held in even year; bottom division for women's national teams)

Club championships
The AVC organizes two more championships for volleyball clubs.
Asian Men's Club Volleyball Championship (held in every year as FIVB Volleyball Men's World Club Championship Qualification Tournament)
Asian Women's Club Volleyball Championship (held in every year as FIVB Volleyball Women's World Club Championship Qualification Tournament)

Tour
The AVC organizes a continental tour for beach volleyball teams.
 AVC Beach Tour (held in even year; involving two-gender tournaments)

Continental qualification tournaments
The AVC organizes four continental qualification tournaments, involving two of three FIVB disciplines (volleyball and beach volleyball).
AVC Men's Tokyo Volleyball Qualification (held in every four years as Olympic Qualification Tournament; tournament's name was exclusive for 2020 Summer Olympics)
AVC Women's Tokyo Volleyball Qualification (held in every four years as Olympic Qualification Tournament; tournament's name was exclusive for 2020 Summer Olympics)
AVC Challenger (held in every year as FIVB Volleyball Challenger Cup Qualification Tournament; involving two-gender tournaments)
AVC Beach Volleyball Continental Cup (held in three seasons as Olympic Qualification Tournament; involving two-gender tournaments)

Current title holders

Results (the 2013 edition was probably unofficial):

U21/U19/U17 Beach Volleyball Medals (2013-2022)

Sponsors
 Mikasa
 SMM Sport
 Senoh
 Gerflor
 Grand Sport Group

FIVB World Rankings

AVC Continental Rankings

References

External links
  

 
Fédération Internationale de Volleyball confederations
Volleyball organizations
Volleyball
Volleyball
Volleyball in Asia
Volleyball in Oceania
Sports organizations established in 1952